Reflexiones may refer:

Reflexiones (Yolandita Monge album), a 1976 album by Yolandita Monge.
Reflexiones (José José album), a 1984 album by José José.